Niantic River Bridge, also known as Amtrak Bascule Bridge No. 116.74, is a railroad bridge carrying Amtrak's Northeast Corridor line across the Niantic River between East Lyme and Waterford, Connecticut. It is a drawbridge with a bascule-type draw span. A new bridge was constructed in 2012 to replace the former span built in 1907. It opened on September 8, 2012. Related construction work finished in June 2013.

History

1907 bridge

The main bridge structure, a  Scherzer through-girder bascule design, was built by the King Bridge Company in 1907 for the New York, New Haven and Hartford Railroad. It was one of eight moveable bridges on the Amtrak route through Connecticut surveyed in one multiple property study in 1986. The eight bridges, from west to east, are: Mianus River Railroad Bridge at Cos Cob, built in 1904; Norwalk River Railroad Bridge at Norwalk, 1896; Saugatuck River Railroad Bridge at Westport, 1905; Pequonnock River Railroad Bridge at Bridgeport, 1902; Housatonic River Railroad Bridge, at Devon, 1905; Connecticut River Railroad Bridge, Old Saybrook-Old Lyme, 1907; this, the Niantic River Bridge, East Lyme-Waterford, 1907; and the Thames River Bridge, Groton, built in 1919.

The bridge was deemed eligible for listing on the National Register of Historic Places in 1987, but was not listed due to owner objection, with decision reference number 87002124.

The 1907 bridge provided just  of vertical clearance when closed, constraining most commercial boats in Niantic Harbor to the bridge schedule. These restrictions made the bridge unpopular with boat owners, which contributed to a 2003 agreement between Amtrak and the Coast Guard which limited the number of daily trains over the bridge. The agreement was later problematic for Amtrak and the state, as it prevented full expansion of Shore Line East service to New London. Due to these clearance issues, as well as increased reliability problems, Amtrak began planning for a replacement for the century-old bridge.

Current bridge

In 2010, construction began on a new fixed-trunnion bascule bridge to replace the 1907 span, in an ARRA-funded project. As part of the project, Amtrak also replenished the beachfront and replaced the Niantic Bay Boardwalk, which had been damaged in storms several years before.

The new Niantic River Bridge was opened to rail traffic on September 8, 2012. Removal of the old bridge, which was crossed by a train for the final time on September 7, began at the wane of the summer boating season in September, while restoration of the beach, pedestrian pathways and boardwalks in the affected area, after being delayed by Hurricane Sandy, continued until May 2013. Amtrak announced the completion of the project in June 2013.

See also
List of bridges documented by the Historic American Engineering Record in Connecticut

References

External links

Bridges in New London County, Connecticut
Railroad bridges in Connecticut
Bridges completed in 1907
Historic American Engineering Record in Connecticut
King Bridge Company
New York, New Haven and Hartford Railroad bridges
Bascule bridges in the United States
Girder bridges in the United States